2018 Ehime FC season.

J2 League

References

External links
 J.League official site

Ehime FC
Ehime FC seasons